"Castles" is a song by English  singer-songwriter Freya Ridings. It was released as a single on 30 May 2019, through record labels Good Soldier Songs and Capitol Records, as the fifth single from her debut studio album, Freya Ridings. The song was written by Ridings and Dan Nigro, the latter of whom also produced the song along with Yves Rothman, additional production was done by Mark Crew, and Dan Priddy.

Background and composition
Produced by Dan Nigro, Mark Crew, Dan Priddy, Yves Rothman, the song was written by Ridings and Nigro. The song additionally features background vocals by American singer-songwriter Zella Day as well as Brendan Reilly, Emily Holligan, Kate Brady, and Simone Daly Richards. 

The song was written after Ridings went through "one of the most brutal breakups of her life", stating that she wanted to use the incredible amount of pain to create something that is "better than she thinks she can be and what that person thought she could be".

Music video
A music video to accompany the release of "Castles" was first released onto YouTube on 10 July 2019 at a total length of three minutes and twenty-eight seconds. The music video was filmed in Shoreditch, London.

Live performances
 Ridings performed the song on the Australian breakfast television program Sunrise on 9 March 2020, in her first visit to the country.

Track listing

Charts

Weekly charts

Year-end charts

Certifications

Release history

References

2019 songs
2019 singles
Freya Ridings songs
Capitol Records singles
Songs about heartache
Songs written by Dan Nigro